William Wright (born 1835) was an English-born American soldier who fought for the Union Navy in the American Civil War. He received a Medal of Honor for his actions during a reconnaissance of Wilmington, North Carolina. The date of issue is unknown.

Medal of Honor Citation

References 

Union Navy sailors
United States Navy Medal of Honor recipients
American Civil War recipients of the Medal of Honor
1835 births
Year of death unknown